LTW may refer to:

 St. Mary's County Regional Airport (IATA airport code: LTW; FAA id: 2W6), Maryland, USA
 Lufttransport Süd (ICAO airline code: LTW; IATA airline code: LU; callsign: LTS), defunct airline
 Luchtvaartmaatschappij Twente (ICAO airline code: LTW; callsign: TWENTAIR), see List of airline codes (L)
 Legal Time Window (LTW), a flag in the MPEG transport stream

See also

 
 
 LWT (disambiguation)
 TWL (disambiguation)
 TLW (disambiguation)
 WTL (disambiguation)
 WLT (disambiguation)